Malcolm Davis (1899 – October 4, 1977) was an American ornithologist and bird keeper.

Early life
Davis was born at Washington, D.C. in 1899. He studied at the University of Maryland, and later graduated from George Washington University with a degree in zoology. During World War I, he served in the Army Signal Corps.

Career
Davis began working at the National Zoological Park in 1927. He worked his way up to becoming head keeper of the Bird Division. During the course of his work, Davis traveled to every continent to collect specimens, including Antarctica three times. He captured and brought back animals from each place he visited, including megafauna such as a Sumatran tiger and an Indian rhinoceros. He traveled with Richard E. Byrd to survey the Davis Islands, which now bear his name. He brought back live emperor penguins, which were transferred to the National Zoological Park on March 5, 1940. He kept some alive for six years, a record at the time.

Davis took part in Operation Windmill to collect animals such as penguins and leopard seals. He traveled on board the USCGC Edisto.

Davis retired from the zoo in 1960, but remained as a consultant to the National Wildlife Federation. He also took care of a monkey colony at the Woodard Research Corporation in Herndon, Virginia.

He died at his home in Herndon, on October 4, 1970, of a heart attack.

References

Scientists from Washington, D.C.
American ornithologists
American Antarctic scientists
1899 births
1977 deaths